Manolis Dermitzakis (born 24 November 1976) is a Greek retired football defender. He was a squad member at the 1998 UEFA European Under-21 Championship, where Greece became runners-up. In the next year he played against Mexico B and won two full international caps.

References

1976 births
Living people
Greek footballers
OFI Crete F.C. players
AEK Larnaca FC players
O.F. Ierapetra F.C. players
Diagoras F.C. players
Super League Greece players
Cypriot First Division players
Association football defenders
Greek expatriate footballers
Expatriate footballers in Cyprus
Greek expatriate sportspeople in Cyprus
Greece under-21 international footballers
Greece international footballers